Ronaldo Conceição Silveira (born 3 April 1987), usually known as Ronaldo or Ronaldo Conceição, is a Brazilian football defender.

Biography
Born in Capão da Canoa, Rio Grande do Sul, Ronaldo started his career with CFZ before moved back to Rio Grande do Sul. He graduated from Grêmio and turned to professional at RS Futebol Clube. After played 6 matches at 2007 Campeonato Brasileiro Série C he left for Nacional de Montevideo and then signed by River Plate de Montevideo.

References

External links
 
 CBF 
 
 Internacional Profile 

1987 births
Living people
Sportspeople from Rio Grande do Sul
Brazilian footballers
Association football central defenders
Porto Alegre Futebol Clube players
Cerâmica Atlético Clube players
Club Nacional de Football players
Club Atlético River Plate (Montevideo) players
Sport Club Internacional players
Clube Náutico Capibaribe players
Clube Atlético Mineiro players
Peñarol players
Centro Atlético Fénix players
Campeonato Brasileiro Série A players
Uruguayan Primera División players
Brazilian expatriate footballers
Brazilian expatriate sportspeople in Uruguay
Expatriate footballers in Uruguay